María del Pilar Oliveros (born 5 October 2001) is a Uruguayan field hockey player.

Personal life
Pilar Oliveros was born and raised in Montevideo, Uruguay.

She is currently studying at the University of Michigan.

Career

Junior national team
Pilar Oliveros made her debut for the Uruguay U–21 team in 2021, at the Pan American Junior Championship in Santiago.

In 2022, she was named in the squad for the FIH Junior World Cup in Potchefstroom.

Las Cimarronas
Oliveros made her debut for Las Cimarronas in 2019. She was a member of the team at the FIH Series Finals in Hiroshima.

In 2019, she represented her country at the XVIII Pan American Games in Lima.

She returned to the side in 2022 for the postponed Pan American Cup in Santiago.

References

External links

2001 births
Living people
Uruguayan female field hockey players
Female field hockey midfielders
Field hockey players at the 2018 Summer Youth Olympics